John S. Stokes was a Chief Master-at-Arms in the United States Navy and a Medal of Honor recipient.

He was born in New York on June 12, 1871.  He enlisted in the Navy and had risen to the rank of chief master-at-arms when, on March 31, 1899, on board the armored cruiser USS New York he jumped overboard to assist in the rescue of a fellow sailor who was in danger of drowning.  For this action he was awarded the Medal of Honor on July 29, 1899.

He was appointed to the warrant officer rank of boatswain on January 31, 1907, and retired from the Navy on July 26, 1911.  He spent the last years of his life at the US Navy Treatment Hospital in Washington, D.C.

He died on February 14, 1923, and is buried in Arlington National Cemetery, Arlington, Virginia. His grave can be found in section 17, lot 20184.

Medal of Honor citation
Rank and organization: Chief Master-at-Arms, U.S. Navy. Born: 12 June 1871, New York, N.Y. Accredited to: New York. G.O. No.: 525 29 July 1899.

Citation:

On board the U.S.S. New York off the coast of Jamaica, 31 March 1899. Showing gallant conduct, Stokes jumped overboard and assisted in the rescue of Peter Mahoney, watertender, U.S. Navy.

See also

List of Medal of Honor recipients during peacetime

References

1871 births
1923 deaths
United States Navy Medal of Honor recipients
United States Navy sailors
Military personnel from New York City
Burials at Arlington National Cemetery
Non-combat recipients of the Medal of Honor